is a Japanese sword. "須賀流" is an archaic word for bee or wasp, which is thought to have been named for its beautiful decoration like a bee or wasp.

The Sugari no Ontachi was first described in the  compiled in 804, and it is believed that new decorations were added to the scabbard and sword fittings at each subsequent Shikinen Sengu to complete the design as we know it today. The scabbards and hanging belts of Sugari no Ontachi and Tamamaki no Ontachi were made in a characteristic style in the Heian period after the end of the 8th century.

A part of the name of Sugari no Ontachi",  is characterized by a curved blade, but the shape of the Sugari no Ontachi is similar to a straight . As Sugari no Ontachi is used for religious services, it is much more gorgeous than swords for actual fighting. The exterior is decorated with fine gold sculptures, multiple bells, crystal, glass, agate and amber, and two crested ibis feathers.

Modern age 
At the 61st Shikinen Sengu in 1993, the Japanese crested ibis was on the verge of extinction and it was thought that   it would be impossible to obtain feathers, but the feathers kept by donors were taken over and they were secured until the 62nd Shikinen Sengu in 2013.

Until the Meiji period, the sacred treasures were made as an offering to Kami in the main hall for 20 years, and then kept in the treasure house for another 20 years to serve as a model for the manufacturing of sacred treasures in later years, and then burned or buried in the shrine grounds. Recently, from October 2015 to October 2016, the old Sugari no Ontachi, which had been replaced, was displayed together with 9 swords including Tamamaki no Ontachi at Jingu Chokokan Museum. Also, old sacred treasures removed from the treasure house may be granted as an Imperial gift to other shrines.

References 

『伊勢神宮の衣食住』（矢野憲一著、東京書籍）、

Ancient swords of Japan
Individual Japanese swords
Mythological swords
Ise Grand Shrine